Teon Kennedy (born June 26, 1986) is an American inactive boxer who was previously the IBF and WBA-NABA dual Super Bantamweight champion.

Amateur career
Kennedy was the 2004 National Golden Gloves flyweight champion and a two-time Pennsylvania Golden Gloves champion.

Professional career
In November 2009, Kennedy stopped Francisco Rodriguez in the tenth round, who died two days later.

On Saturday, September 25, 2010, Kennedy stopped Alex Becerra of El Paso, Texas, to win the vacant NABA Super Bantamweight title in the Grand Ballroom main event at Bally's Atlantic City Hotel and Casino.

Professional boxing record

| style="text-align:center;" colspan="8"|19 Wins (7 knockouts), 2 Losses  2 Draws 0 No Contest
|-
|align=center style="border-style: none none solid solid; background: #e3e3e3"|Res.
|align=center style="border-style: none none solid solid; background: #e3e3e3"|Record
|align=center style="border-style: none none solid solid; background: #e3e3e3"|Opponent
|align=center style="border-style: none none solid solid; background: #e3e3e3"|Type
|align=center style="border-style: none none solid solid; background: #e3e3e3"|Rd., Time
|align=center style="border-style: none none solid solid; background: #e3e3e3"|Date
|align=center style="border-style: none none solid solid; background: #e3e3e3"|Location
|align=center style="border-style: none none solid solid; background: #e3e3e3"|Notes
|-
|Loss
|align=center|17–2
|align=left| Guillermo Rigondeaux
|align=center|
|
|
|align=left|
|align=left|
|-
|-align=center
|Win  || 17-0 ||align=left| Jorge Diaz
|
| 
|
|align=left|
|align=left|
|-align=center

References

External links

1986 births
Super-bantamweight boxers
Boxers from Philadelphia
Living people
American male boxers